The Vancouver Stealth are a lacrosse team based in Vancouver, British Columbia. The team plays in the National Lacrosse League (NLL). The 2018 season is the 19th in franchise history and the 5th season in Vancouver. The franchise previously played in Everett, Washington, San Jose, and Albany, New York.

Regular season

Final standings

Game log

Roster

Entry Draft
The 2017 NLL Entry Draft took place on September 18, 2017. The Stealth made the following selections:

See also
2018 NLL season

References

Vancouver
Vancouver Stealth seasons
Vancouver Stealth